Dr. Robert Anthony Beddard was, until 2006, the Cowen Fellow and Tutor in Modern History, Oriel College, Oxford. 
He holds a master's degree (MA), a Doctorate (Doctor of Philosophy), a Cambridge Master's (MA) and a Bachelor's (BA) from London. 
He was a fellow Queens' College, Cambridge from 1965 to 1968.
He is a Fellow of the Royal Historical Society.
His research interests lie in 17th century British politics and religion, and include relations between Stuart England and Rome.

Publications 
 'The Restoration Church' in The Restored Monarchy, 1660-1688 (ed. J.R. Jones), (1978)
 A Kingdom Without a King: The Journal of the Provisional Government in the Revolution of 1688. (Oxford, 1988)
 The Revolutions of 1688. (Oxford, 1991)
 Restoration Oxford', 'Tory Oxford', and 'James II and the Catholic challenge in The History of the University of Oxford, IV: Seventeenth-Century Oxford (ed. N. Tyacke), (Oxford, 1997)
 'A Traitor's gift: Hugh Peter's donation to the Bodleian Library', The Bodleian Library Record. Vol 16 (1999) pp. 374–90
 'Pope Clement X's inauguration of the Holy Year of 1675', Archivum Historiae Pontificiae. Vol 30 (2000)
 'Six Unpublished Letters of Queen Henrietta Maria', The British Library Journal. Vol 25 (2000) pp. 129–43
 'Isaac Basire: The Bodleian Library's first foreign reader', The Bodleian Library Record. (2003)

Criticism
"Robert Beddard looks at two books on the decisive turning point of 1688.", History Today, June 2006, Volume: 56 Issue: 6, Page 62-62

References

Fellows of Oriel College, Oxford
Fellows of Queens' College, Cambridge
Fellows of the Royal Historical Society
Alumni of the University of Cambridge
Alumni of the University of London
Year of birth missing (living people)
Living people